Greece competed at the 2016 Winter Youth Olympics in Lillehammer, Norway from 12 to 21 February 2016.

Alpine skiing

Girls

Biathlon

Boys

Cross-country skiing

Boys

See also
Greece at the 2016 Summer Olympics

References

2016 in Greek sport
Nations at the 2016 Winter Youth Olympics
Greece at the Youth Olympics